Günter Theodor Netzer (born 14 September 1944) is a German former professional football player, executive and pundit. He achieved great success in Germany with Borussia Mönchengladbach in the early 1970s and, after moving to Spain in 1973, with Real Madrid. A technically gifted playmaker, Netzer played as an attacking midfielder and is considered one of the greatest passers in the game's history. He was voted German Footballer of the Year twice, in 1972 and 1973. 

Netzer was the general manager for Hamburger SV during much of the team's golden period from the late 1970s through the early 1980s, when the club won three league titles and the 1983 European Cup.

Club career

Borussia Mönchengladbach 
Netzer, the son of a greengrocer, played for 1. FC Mönchengladbach from the age of eight until 19 before switching to city rivals Borussia Mönchengladbach in 1963. He scored on his debut against Rot-Weiß Oberhausen, and quickly established himself as a first team regular, helping the club win promotion to the Bundesliga in 1965.

Netzer played for Borussia, managed by Hennes Weisweiler, until 1973. In his 230 Bundesliga games for them, he scored 82 goals. The era also saw one of the most competitive rivalries in the Bundesliga's history between Borussia Mönchengladbach and Bayern Munich. Bayern Munich had stars Franz Beckenbauer, Gerd Müller, Hans-Georg Schwarzenbeck, Paul Breitner and Sepp Maier on their side while Mönchengladbach had Berti Vogts, Herbert Wimmer, Jupp Heynckes, Rainer Bonhof and Netzer. When they achieved their first successes the average age of both teams was 21.

With Borussia Mönchengladbach he won the Bundesliga in 1970 and 1971 (the first Bundesliga club to win back-to-back championships), and the DFB-Pokal in 1973. The final was a famous match against 1. FC Köln in which he started as a sub  – it is said because he had told his manager of his intention to move to Spain after the season – and went onto the pitch during extra time on his own authority, simply telling the coach "I'll go and play now" whilst removing his tracksuit. He then went on to score the winning goal three minutes later, with only his second possession of the ball. By then Netzer had achieved a certain pop star-like popularity because of his good looks, flowing blond hair, and perceived rebel personality and playboy lifestyle. Netzer was voted German Footballer of the Year twice, in 1972 and 1973, by the country's football journalists. 

Netzer was a playmaker and is considered one of the best midfielders of all time, gaining a lot of attention with his long passes and pushes from deep within his own half of the pitch. Apart from his superior ball skills, his natural authority made him the undisputed leader of his team. As a player for Borussia Mönchengladbach, he enjoyed a lot of freedom from the management and the coach Hennes Weisweiler, even off the pitch. On the field the way he orchestrated the team's midfield play earned him the nickname 'Karajan', after the conductor Herbert Von Karajan.

Real Madrid 

When Johan Cruyff joined FC Barcelona in 1973, Real Madrid needed to respond in kind. So Santiago Bernabéu signed him and Paul Breitner a year later. Netzer was the first German player to play for the club. He played in Spain until 1976, winning La Liga in 1975 and 1976 and the Copa del Rey in 1974 and 1975. After his three-year spell in the Spanish capital, Netzer joined Grasshopper Club Zürich, where in 1977 he finished his playing career.

International career 
Netzer made his debut for the West German national team in October 1965 in a friendly against Austria. He represented West Germany 37 times from 1965 to 1975, scoring six goals (some from the penalty spot) and playing a vital role in the country's victory at UEFA Euro 1972. He also appeared briefly (for 21 minutes against East Germany) in the 1974 FIFA World Cup, during which time the only goal of the match was scored against his team. At the tournament, Wolfgang Overath was the central figure in Germany's midfield; Netzer, despite being friends with Overath, considered the pair as not being able to play together effectively. Although he did not play in the final, Netzer is nonetheless considered the first World Cup winner to, at the time of winning, play for a club that was based outside his country.

Managerial career 

After his career as a player Netzer offered to publish Hamburger SV's stadium magazine. The president, Paul Benthien, agreed on the condition that he also became general manager. Netzer spent eight successful years in Hamburg, during which time he completely transformed Hamburg's team, managed to sign famous coaches like Branko Zebec and later Ernst Happel, and led the club to three Bundesliga titles (1979, 1982, 1983). In 1983, Hamburg reached the final of the European Cup. With Horst Hrubesch, Felix Magath and Manfred Kaltz, Hamburg pulled off one of the biggest upsets in European Cup history by beating a Juventus side packed with Italian players who had won the World Cup a year earlier and two star import players – Michel Platini and Zbigniew Boniek. The years with Günter Netzer are today considered the most successful period in Hamburg's history.

Media businessman and football expert 
After the end of his playing career, Netzer founded an advertising agency in Zürich, Switzerland, where he continues to live. He also deals in TV rights and is currently executive director of the Swiss sports rights managing agency Infront Sports & Media AG, a partner company of the German Football Association.

Apart from that, Netzer worked as a reporter and football pundit on TV. For his work with the German TV channel ARD and host Gerhard Delling, commenting on games of the German national team, both received the prestigious Adolf Grimme Award in 2000.

Despite their frequent arguments on TV, which they have developed into a kind of iconic skit, Netzer and Delling are said to be close friends. Netzer was Delling's best man at his wedding in May 2003.

It was the duo's harsh criticism of the German national side's poor performance that triggered Rudi Völler's famous eruption on 6 September 2003, immediately after the international match against Iceland. The then Bundestrainer (manager) harshly criticized Netzer, some considered it abusively, in a live interview after the goalless draw.

Following the 2010 FIFA World Cup in South Africa, Netzer announced he was leaving the ARD after 13 years.

Netzer is married and has one daughter. He lives in Switzerland and has Swiss citizenship, too.

Career statistics

Scores and results list Germany's goal tally first, score column indicates score after each Netzer goal.

Honours

As player 
Borussia Mönchengladbach
 Bundesliga: 1969–70, 1970–71
 DFB-Pokal: 1972–73
 UEFA Cup runner-up: 1972–73

Real Madrid
 La Liga: 1974–75, 1975–76
 Copa del Rey: 1973–74, 1974–75

West Germany
 UEFA European Championship: 1972
 FIFA World Cup: 1974

Individual
 kicker Bundesliga Team of the Season: 1965–66, 1966–67, 1967–68, 1968–69, 1969–70, 1970–71, 1971–72
 Goal of the Year (Germany): 1971, 1972
 Footballer of the Year (Germany): 1972, 1973
 UEFA European Championship Team of the Tournament: 1972
 Ballon d'Or runner-up: 1972
 World Soccer: The Greatest Players of the 20th century (75th place)
 Member of Germany's Sports Hall of Fame

As general manager 
Hamburger SV
 Bundesliga: 1978–79, 1981–82, 1982–83
 European Cup: 1982–83
 Intercontinental Cup runner-up: 1983

Notes

References

External links 

1944 births
Living people
Sportspeople from Mönchengladbach
Footballers from North Rhine-Westphalia
German footballers
Association football midfielders
Borussia Mönchengladbach players
Real Madrid CF players
Grasshopper Club Zürich players
Bundesliga players
La Liga players
Swiss Super League players
Germany international footballers
UEFA Euro 1972 players
UEFA European Championship-winning players
1974 FIFA World Cup players
FIFA World Cup-winning players
West German expatriate footballers
West German expatriate sportspeople in Spain
West German expatriate sportspeople in Switzerland
Expatriate footballers in Spain
Expatriate footballers in Switzerland
German emigrants to Switzerland
Members of the Order of Merit of North Rhine-Westphalia
Hamburger SV non-playing staff
German sports journalists
German sports broadcasters
German male journalists
German male writers
West German footballers